Forrest McCreery "Jap" Douds (April 21, 1905 – August 16, 1979) was an All-American football player at Washington and Jefferson College in suburban Washington, Pennsylvania, where he was selected as an All-American three times and was the first player ever selected to the East–West Game in two separate seasons. He played professional American football player for the Portsmouth Spartans, Providence Steam Roller, Chicago Cardinals, and the Pittsburgh Pirates. He was named to the 1930 NFL All-Pro Team. In 1933, he became the first coach of the Pittsburgh Steelers in 1933 leading the team to a 3–6–2 record before being replaced in the off-season.

He was inducted into the Beaver County Sports Hall of Fame in 1976.

References

External links
 

1905 births
1979 deaths
American football tackles
Chicago Cardinals players
Pittsburgh Pirates (football) coaches
Pittsburgh Pirates (football) players
Portsmouth Spartans players
Providence Steam Roller players
Washington & Jefferson Presidents football players
People from Rochester, Pennsylvania
Players of American football from Pennsylvania
Pittsburgh Pirates head coaches